The Japanese and Manchukuoan order of battle for Operation Nekka was:

Japan 

Kwangtung Army

Jehol Operation Force - Field Marshal Baron Nobuyoshi Muto, 
 6th Division (11th & 36th Infantry Brigades) - Lt. Gen. Sakamoto
 8th Division (4th & 16th Infantry Brigades) - Lt. Gen. Nishi
 14th Mixed Brigade / 7th Division - Major Gen. Hattori
 33rd Mixed Brigade / 10th Division - Major Gen. Nakamura
 4th Cavalry Brigade - Major Gen. Mogi
 1st Special Tank Company - Captain Hyakutake
 11 x Type 89 Medium Tank
  2 x Type 92 Combat Cars

Manchukuo Imperial Army

Manchukuoan Force 42,000 men - Zhang Haipeng

Manchukuoan units with the Japanese  Northern Column 10,000 men
 Taoliao Army - Zhang Haipeng (concurrent)
 7 Detachments( at least 2 are cavalry brigades)
 National Foundation Army (Manchukuo Preparatory 2nd Corps) - Zheng Guorui
 3 Detachments

Manchukuoan units with the Japanese Eastern Column  15,000 men 
 National Protection Army (Fengtian Province Garrison Corps) - Yu Zhishan
 1st Brigade of the Guard Corps (Manchukuo Imperial Guards) - Li Shoushan
 National Salvation Army (about 10,000 men) - Li Jizhun

China 
5th Army Group - Commander in chief Tang Yulin (governor of Rehe)
55th Army - Tang Yulin
 36th Division - Tang Yulin, at Beipiao,
 36th Cavalry Regiment - Shao Benliang, at Beipiao, Chaoyang, Zhuluke and Jianping. Shao defected to the Japanese.
 31st Brigade - ?, at Heishuizhen-Chifeng
 Reserve Regiment - ?, at Pingquan-Chengde
 36th Artillery Regiment - ?, near Pingzhen
 1st Cavalry Brigade - ?, at Qinglianggou
 9th Cavalry Brigade - Cui Xingwu, at Kailu. Cui defected to the Japanese.
 10th Cavalry Brigade - ?, at Tianshan

6th Army Group - Zhang Zuoxiang (former governor of Jilin)*
 41st Army - Sun Dianying
 117th Brigade - Ding Ting, at Haladaokou, east of Chifeng.
 118th Brigade - Liu Yueting, to the north of Chifeng
 Reinforced 1st Brigade - Xing Yuchou, to the north of Chifeng
 Northeastern Loyal and Brave Army - Feng Zhanhai, to the north of Chifeng
 10th Cavalry Division - Deng Wen
 11th Cavalry Division - Tan Zixin
 12th Cavalry Division - Wu Songlin
 21st Cavalry Brigade - Guo Fenglai
 1st Infantry Brigade - Tang Zhongxin

4th Army Group - Wan Fulin* (former chairman of Heilongjiang)
 53rd Army - Wan Fulin	
 130th Division - Zhu Hongxun, at Yebaishou - Dachengzi
 119th Division - Sun Dequan, Dachengzi – Lingnan
 129th Division - Wang Yongsheng, Pingquan – Sanshijia
 116th Division - Miao Chengliu, Lamadong – Yiyuankou
 106th Division - Shen Ke, Daordeng – Tangdaohe
 11th Artillery Regiment, Lingyuan
 108th Division - Yang Zhengzhi, East of Lingnan on February 27

Notes

Sources 
 Jehol 1933
 Operation Jehol
 Battles of the Great Wall
 Jowett, Phillip J., Rays of the Rising Sun Vol 1., Helion & Co. Ltd. 2004.
 

Jehol
Jehol